Bernard is a given name and a family name.

Bernard may also refer to:

Given or monastic name

Surname

Places
 Bernard, Iowa, United States
 Bernard Terminal, a bus terminal in the York Region Transit/VIVA system in Richmond Hill, Ontario, Canada
 Great St Bernard Pass, the third highest road pass in Switzerland
 Bernard (crater), a crater on Mars
 St Bernard Pass (disambiguation)
 San Bernardino Pass, between Thusis and Bellinzona in Switzerland

Other uses 
 "Bernard", a song by Kazumi Watanabe from the album Kilowatt
 Bernard (TV series), a short animated TV series
 Bernard Brewery, a Czech family brewery
 St. Bernard (dog), a Swiss dog breed

See also
 Barnard (disambiguation)
 Bernat (disambiguation) 
 Bernhard (disambiguation)
 San Bernardino (disambiguation)
 São Bernardo (disambiguation)
 Saint Bernard (disambiguation)
 Société des Avions Bernard, French aircraft manufacturer
 St Bernard Cistercian monastery, now part of the front Quad of St John's College, Oxford, England